Disco is a genre of music originating in the 1970s.

Disco, DISCO or Discos may also refer to:
 Discothèque, a nightclub that primarily plays disco music

Places in the United States 
 Disco, Illinois, an unincorporated community in Hancock County
 Disco, Michigan, a ghost town in Oceana County
 Disco, Tennessee, an unincorporated community in Blount County
 Disco, Wisconsin, an unincorporated community in Jackson County

People 
 Disco Shanti, Indian actress
 Disco Inferno (wrestler) (born 1968), American professional wrestler
 Disco Fury, Canadian professional wrestler, trainer of Bambi Hall

Arts and entertainment

Films
 Disco (2008 film), a French film starring Franck Dubosc
 Disco (2012 film), a Telugu comedy film
 Disco, a 2010 British short film written and directed by Luke Snellin
 "Disco", 2003 episode of British television series Balamory

Music

Albums 
 Disco (Grace Jones album), 2015
 Disco (Kylie Minogue album), 2020
 Disco (Pet Shop Boys album), 1986
 Disco, a 2008 album by Uhm Jung-hwa

Songs 
 "D.I.S.C.O.", by Ottawan, 1979
 "Disco", by Crossfade from Crossfade, 2004
 "Disco", by Metro Station from Metro Station, 2007
 "Disco", by The Music from The Music, 2003
 "Disco", by Slum Village from Trinity (Past, Present and Future), 2002
 "Disco", by Surf Curse from Heaven Surrounds You, 2019
 "Disco", by Turnstile from Time & Space, 2018
 "Disco", by Widespread Panic from Light Fuse, Get Away, 1997

Other music 
 Disco Ensemble, Finnish post-hardcore/punk band originally called DisCo
 Disco mix, a remix style

Other
 Disco (TV series), German music show, 1971–1982
 Disco: A Decade of Saturday Nights, 2003–2005 touring exhibition on disco culture

Brands and enterprises
 Disco (software), optical-disk burning software for Mac OS X
 Disco Corporation, Japanese precision-tool manufacturer
 Dominion Iron and Steel Company, or DISCO, Canadian mining company, 1901–1921
 Disco (supermarket chain), an Argentine supermarket chain founded in 1961
 Supermercados Disco del Uruguay, an Uruguayan supermarket chain
 DISCO (diagnostic interview), the Diagnostic Interview for Social and Communication Disorders
 Discos (snack), a wheat and potato-based snack food

Other uses
 Disco fashion, a clothing style in the 1970s

See also 
 Disc (disambiguation) (also covers disk)
 Disco Inferno (disambiguation)
 Discovery (disambiguation), some products named "Discovery" are nicknamed "Disco"
 Disko (disambiguation)